The Hankook Ilbo Literary Award (한국일보문학상) is a South Korean literary award. It is one of South Korea's most prestigious literary awards, established in 1968 by Hankook Ilbo. It is awarded annually to the creative literary work published within the year.

Winners

References 

South Korean literary awards
Fiction awards
Awards established in 1955
1955 establishments in South Korea